Thomas Saunders Gholson (December 9, 1808 – December 12, 1868) was a Virginia lawyer, judge and Confederate politician.

Early and family life
He was born in Gholsonville, Brunswick County, Virginia to Major William Gholson (1775–1831) and his wife Mary Saunders (1776–1842), and was the younger brother of James H. Gholson (1798–1848). Their uncle Thomas Gholson, Jr. (1780–1816) had served in the Virginia General Assembly and as U.S. Congressman, before dying in Brunswick County, Virginia of the lingering effects of a wound received during the defense of Washington D.C. during the War of 1812. He graduated from the University of Virginia in 1827.

On May 14, 1829 Thomas Gholson married his cousin, the congressman's daughter Cary Ann Gholson (1808–1896), and they had two daughters and a son. Rev. John Yates Gholson (1830–1886) married in New Orleans and later moved to Alabama, and Georgiana F. Gholson Walker (1833–1904) married and moved to New York City.

Career
After reading law and being admitted to the Virginia bar, around 1836, Thomas Gholson also invested in the Brunswick Land Company, as did his elder and politically active brother and several other prominent local men (including Rev. Richard Kidder Meade). Each bought $1000 shares of the company, which bought, traded and speculated in lands in Texas.  In 1847, the Virginia House of Delegates received a complaint against his brother Judge James H. Gholson, alleging favoritism towards Thomas Gholson, among others. When the complainant, R. H. Collier, who had also publicly assaulted one of the Gholsons, refused to testify under oath before the appointed committee, the legislative investigation was dropped, but his brother died the following year. Thomas Gholson was a legal and possibly legislative mentor to Hugh White Sheffey who served in the legislature and also became Speaker of the Virginia House of Delegates during the American Civil War, and later a judge.

Around 1850, after his brother's death, Thomas moved his family to Blandford, which is closer to (and now part of) Petersburg. Although owning only $7500 in property in 1850 (shortly after his brother's death), by 1860 Thomas Saunders Gholson owned $100,000 in real estate and $120,000 in personal property. Petersburg became a railroad hub in this era; Judge Gholson was president of several railroads, and also worked to support a public library in Petersburg.

Virginia's legislators confirmed Thomas Gholson as a state court judge, and he served from 1859 to 1863, when he resigned to serve in the House of Representatives of the Second Confederate Congress. He defeated Petersburg lawyer Charles Fenton Collier (son of Robert Ruffin Collier, possibly the complainant years earlier) and represented Prince George County, Virginia(which adjoins Petersburg) as well as nearby Nottaway, Amelia, Powhatan and Cumberland Counties from 1864 until the war's end in 1865. On February 1, 1865, Gholson delivered a speech concerning the possibility of using Negro troops, which was published. Thomas Gholson received a pardon from President Andrew Johnson on September 6, 1865.

Death and legacy
Gholson died in 1868 in Savannah, Georgia, and his remains were returned to Virginia for burial at Blandford Cemetery. His son, who became an Episcopal priest, named his son born in Marengo County, Alabama in 1870 after his grandfather.

References

1808 births
1868 deaths
Virginia lawyers
University of Virginia alumni
Virginia state court judges
People of Virginia in the American Civil War
People from Brunswick County, Virginia
People from Petersburg, Virginia
Members of the Confederate House of Representatives from Virginia
19th-century American politicians
19th-century American judges
19th-century American lawyers